The Chinese softshell turtle (Pelodiscus sinensis) is a species of softshell turtle that is native to China (Inner Mongolia to Guangxi, including Hong Kong) and Taiwan, with records of escapees—some of which have established introduced populations—in a wide range of other Asian countries, as well as Spain, Brazil and Hawaii.

Populations native to Northeast China, Russia, Korea and Japan were formerly included in this species, but are now regarded as separate as the northern Chinese softshell turtle (P. maackii). Furthermore, localized populations in Guangxi and Hunan (where the Chinese softshell turtle also is present), as well as Vietnam, are recognized as the lesser Chinese softshell turtle (P. parviformis) and Hunan softshell turtle (P. axenaria).

The Chinese softshell turtle is a vulnerable species, threatened by disease, habitat loss, and collection for food such as turtle soup. Additionally, millions are now farmed, especially in China, to support the food industry, and it is the world's most economically important turtle.

Description 
Females of the Chinese softshell turtle can reach up to 33 cm in carapace length, while the smaller males reach 27 cm, with longer tails than the females. Maturity is reached at a carapace length of 18-19 cm. It has webbed feet for swimming. They are called "softshell" because their carapace lacks horny scutes (scales). The carapace is leathery and pliable, particularly at the sides. The central part of the carapace has a layer of solid bone beneath it, as in other turtles, but this is absent at the outer edges. The light and flexible shell of these turtles allows them to move more easily in open water, or in muddy lake bottoms.

The carapace of these turtles is olive in color and may have dark blotches. The plastron is orange-red, and may also have large dark blotches. The limbs and head are olive dorsally with the forelimbs lighter and the hind-limbs orange-red ventrally. There are dark flecks on the head and dark lines that radiate from the eyes. The throat is mottled and there may be small, dark bars on the lips. A pair of dark blotches is found in front of the tail as well as a black band on the posterior side of each thigh.

Distribution and habitat

Distribution 
The Chinese softshell turtle is native to Taiwan and China, where it is found in Anhui, Fujian, Gansu, Guangdong, Guangxi, Guizhou, Hebei, Henan, Hong Kong, Hubei, Hunan, Inner Mongolia (Nei Mongol), Jiangsu, Jiangxi, Shaanxi, Shandong, Shanxi, Sichuan, Yunnan and Zhejiang Provinces.

Populations native to Northeast China, Russia, Korea and Japan were formerly included in this species, but are now regarded as separate as the Amur softshell turtle (P. maackii). Populations in Vietnam and Hainan Island are now recognized as the spotted softshell turtle (P. variegatus). Furthermore, localized populations in Guangxi, Hunan, and Anhui (where the Chinese softshell turtle also is present) are recognized as the lesser Chinese softshell turtle (P. parviformis), Hunan softshell turtle (P. axenaria), and Huangshan softshell turtle (P. huangshanensis).

It is difficult to determine its exact native range of the Chinese softshell turtle due to the long tradition of use as a food and herbal medicinal, and subsequent spread by migrating people. Outside their native China, escapees have been recorded in a wide range of countries and some of these have becomes established as introduced populations. Among the non-native locations in Asia are the Bonin Islands, Honshu, Kyushu, Ryukyu Archipelago and Shikoku in Japan; South Korea; Laos; Vietnam; Thailand; Singapore; Bohol, Cebu, Leyte, Luzon, Mindanao, Mindoro and Panay in the Philippines; East and Peninsular Malaysia; Kalimantan, Sumatra and West Timor in Indonesia; East Timor; and Iran. Outside Asia, locations include Pará in Brazil; Spain; and Guam, Northern Mariana Islands and Oahu (Hawaii) in the United States.

Habitat
Chinese softshell turtles live in fresh and brackish water. In China these turtles are found in rivers, lakes, ponds, canals and creeks with slow currents, and in Hawaii they can be found in marshes and drainage ditches.

Ecology and behavior

Diet 
These turtles are predominantly carnivorous and the remains of fish, crustaceans, mollusks, insects, and seeds of marsh plants have been found in their stomachs.

Movement
With their long snout and tubelike nostrils, these turtles can "snorkel" in shallow water. When resting, they lie at the bottom, buried in sand or mud, lifting their head to breathe or snatch at prey. Their basking habit is not well developed.

Chinese softshell turtles often submerge their heads in water. This is because they carry a gene which produces a protein that allows them to secrete urea from their mouths. This adaptation helps them survive in brackish water by making it possible for them to excrete urea without drinking too much salty water. Rather than eliminating urea by urinating through their cloaca as most turtles do, which involves significant water loss, they simply rinse their mouths in the water.

When provoked, certain populations of these turtles are capable of excreting a foul smelling fluid from pores on the anterior edge of their shells.

Life cycle
These turtles reach sexual maturity sometime between 4 and 6 years of age. They mate at the surface or under water. A male will hold the female's carapace with its forelimbs and may bite at her head, neck, and limbs. Females may retain sperm for almost a year after copulation.

The females lay 8–30 eggs in a clutch and may lay from 2 to 5 clutches each year. After an incubation period of about 60 days, which may be longer or shorter depending upon temperature, the eggs hatch. Sex of the hatchlings is not determined by incubation temperature.

Diseases 
In the intensive aquacultural industry Chinese softshell turtle are increasingly vulnerable to multiple bacterial diseases. In 2012 Chinese soft-shell turtles were the first turtle species to undergo a large-scale outbreak of bacterial softshell disease, resulting in slower growth and increased fatality. This lead not only to a decline in P. sinensis, but caused severe economic losses to the turtle culture industry. Aeromonas spp., Citrobacter freundii, and Edwardsiella tarda have all been identified as the most significant causative bacterial organisms. Other bacterial pathogens identified have been Chryseobacterium spp., Morganella morganii and Bacillus cereus spp..

Conservation
Wild populations are listed as vulnerable on the IUCN Red List. In contrast, the mass farming and release of P. sinensis has been known to lead to hybridization several other unique Pelodiscus lineages, some of which may be their own distinct species, which in turn threatens their gene pool.

Relations with humans
The Chinese softshell turtle is the most commonly raised species in China's turtle farms. According to the data obtained from 684 Chinese turtle farms, they sold over 91 million turtles of this species every year; considering that these farms represented less than half of the 1,499 registered turtle farms in China, the nationwide total could be over twice as high. These turtles are considered a delicacy in many parts of Asia. Turtle soup is made from this species. In Japan, they may be stewed with hōtō noodles and served as a winter delicacy. Many Koreans, even today, generally have a taboo against eating turtles which has origins in native Korean shamanism.

These turtles can be injured if they are dropped or hit, and are susceptible to shell fungus. Within Europe, the turtle is a popular pet, particularly in countries such as Italy and the Czech Republic. Captives of this species will eat canned and fresh fish, canned dog food, raw beef, mice, frogs, and chicken. However, in captivity they do not usually eat turtle feed. They can deliver a painful bite if provoked, but will usually let go after a while.

Synonyms
Numerous synonyms have been used for this species:

 Testudo rostrata Thunberg, 1787 (nomen suppressum)
 Testudo striata Suckow, 1798
 Testudo semimembranacea Hermann, 1804 (nomen suppressum et rejectum)
 Emydes rostrata – Brongniart, 1805
 Trionyx (Aspidonectes) sinensis Wiegmann, 1834 (nomen conservandum)
 Trionyx japonicus – Temminck & Schlegel, 1835
 Trionyx tuberculatus Cantor, 1842
 Pelodiscus sinensis – Fitzinger, 1843
 Tyrse perocellata Gray, 1844
 Trionyx perocellatus – Gray, 1856
 Trionyx schlegelii Brandt, 1857
 Potamochelys perocellatus – Gray, 1864
 Potamochelys tuberculatus – Gray, 1864
 Landemania irrorata Gray, 1869
 Landemania perocellata – Gray, 1869
 Trionyx peroculatus Günther, 1869 (ex errore)
 Gymnopus perocellatus – David, 1872
 Gymnopus simonii David, 1875 (nomen nudum)
 Ceramopelta latirostris Heude, 1880
 Cinctisternum bicinctum Heude, 1880
 Coelognathus novemcostatus Heude, 1880
 Coptopelta septemcostata Heude, 1880
 Gomphopelta officinae Heude, 1880
 Psilognathus laevis Heude, 1880
 Temnognathus mordax Heude, 1880
 Trionyx sinensis newtoni Bethencourt-Ferreira, 1897
 Tortisternum novemcostatum Heude, 1880
 Temnognanthus mordax – Boulenger, 1889
 Tyrse sinensis – Hay, 1904
 Amyda japonica – Stejneger, 1907
 Amyda schlegelii – Stejneger, 1907
 Amyda sinensis – Stejneger, 1907
 Amyda tuberculata – Schmidt, 1927
 Trionyx sinensis sinensis – Smith, 1931
 Trionyx sinensis tuberculatus – Smith, 1931
 Amyda schlegelii haseri Pavlov, 1932
 Amyda schlegelii licenti Pavlov, 1932
 Amyda sinensis sinensis – Mertens, Müller & Rust, 1934
 Amyda sinensis tuberculata – Mertens, Müller & Rust, 1934
 Trionyx schlegeli Chkhikvadze, 1987 (ex errore)
 Trionix sinensis – Richard, 1999
 Pelodiscus sinensis sinensis – Ferri, 2002
 Pelodiscus sinensis tuberculatus – Ferri, 2002
 Pelodiscus sinensis japonicus – Joseph-Ouni, 2004

Genetics
The genome of Pelodiscus sinensis was sequenced in 2013 to examine the development and evolution of the softshell turtle body plan.

References

Bibliography 

 Wiegmann, A. F. A. 1835. Beiträge zur Zoologie, gesammelt auf einer Reise um die Erde, von Dr. F. J. F. Meyen. Amphibien ". Nova Acta Acad. Leopold.-Carol. 17: 185-268. ("Trionyx (Aspidonectes ) sinensis ", new species, pp. 189–195). (in German).

External links

 Turtles of the World - Pelodiscus sinensis
 View the Chinese softshell turtle genome in Ensembl

Pelodiscus
Turtles of Asia
Reptiles of China
Reptiles of Taiwan
Biota of Hong Kong
Reptiles described in 1835
Vulnerable fauna of Asia